Judge Edwards may refer to:

Edward Livingston Edwards (1812–1894), judge of the Missouri First Judicial Circuit
George Clifton Edwards Jr. (1914–1995), judge of the United States Court of Appeals for the Sixth Circuit
Harry T. Edwards (born 1940), judge of the United States Court of Appeals for the District of Columbia Circuit
Pierpont Edwards (1750–1826), judge of the United States District Court for the District of Connecticut

See also
Justice Edwards (disambiguation)